The Akron City Series is a high school athletic conference based entirely in the city of Akron, Ohio, United States, that includes the six high schools of the Akron Public Schools. It competes as part of the Ohio High School Athletic Association (OHSAA).

Current members

History
The City Series dates back to the 1911 establishment of Akron's second high school, South High School, which resulted in the existing Akron High School, established in 1886, being renamed Central High School. The football teams from Central and South met for the first time that year in the "city championship game", won by Central. The City Series was informally established in 1914 a third high school in the city, West High School, opened. The Akron Beacon Journal began naming an "All-City Team" that year and the schools all had a playing field of their own. In 1916 North High School opened, though it did not compete with a full City Series schedule until 1920, the first season the school had seniors. East High School opened in 1922 and joined in 1924, followed by Garfield opening in 1926 and joining in 1927 along with Hower Vocational. Kenmore, which had opened in 1916, and Ellet, which dated to 1891, were annexed into Akron in 1929 and joined the City Series in 1930, and Buchtel opened in 1931 and joined in 1932 to briefly bring membership to 10 schools. The following year, though, it returned to nine after Ellet, then still a much smaller and school than the other Akron high schools, left the league. Membership was steady at nine until 1953 when West High School became a junior high school. The league returned to nine members in 1963 with the opening of Firestone High School and remained at nine until 1970. The City Series briefly dropped to eight members again in 1970 when Central and Hower Vocational High Schools were closed and merged to create Central–Hower High School, but again returned to nine members when Ellet High School rejoined the league in 1971. Membership remained at nine schools until 1980 when South High School closed, then stayed at eight schools for 26 more years, until Central–Hower closed in 2006. Series membership dropped to the current six schools in 2017 when Kenmore and Garfield were closed and merged into a new school known as Kenmore–Garfield, which was renamed Garfield in 2022.

Former members

See also
Ohio High School Athletic Conferences

References

External links
Akron Public Schools

Ohio high school sports conferences